Skipton and Ripon is a constituency in North Yorkshire represented in the House of Commons of the UK Parliament since 2010 by Julian Smith, a Conservative.

Constituency profile
The constituency covers a mainly rural area of the Yorkshire Dales.  The largest settlements are the town of Skipton and the city of Ripon.  Smaller towns in the constituency are Bentham, Settle, Pateley Bridge and Masham.

It is one of the safest seats in England, formed on an area with a long history of Conservative representation and with a large majority of its electorate having in the last election voted Conservative. It was also the constituency in 1992 that when declared, saw the Conservatives gain the 4th straight majority since 1979 and John Major re-elected as Prime Minister.

At 1.6%, Skipton and Ripon had significantly lower than national average unemployment (3.8%) in November 2012.

Boundaries

1983–1997: The District of Craven, and the Borough of Harrogate wards of Almscliffe, Bishop Monkton, Boroughbridge, Fountains, Killinghall, Kirkby Malzeard, Lower Nidderdale, Mashamshire, Newby, Nidd Valley, Pateley Bridge, Ripon East, Ripon West, Wathvale, and Wharfedale Moors.

1997–2010: The District of Craven, and the Borough of Harrogate wards of Almscliffe, Bishop Monkton, Fountains, Killinghall, Kirkby Malzeard, Lower Nidderdale, Mashamshire, Nidd Valley, Pateley Bridge, Ripon East, Ripon West, and Wharfedale Moors.

2010–present: The District of Craven, and the Borough of Harrogate wards of Bishop Monkton, Kirkby Malzeard, Lower Nidderdale, Mashamshire, Newby, Nidd Valley, Pateley Bridge, Ripon Minster, Ripon Moorside, Ripon Spa, Washburn, and Wathvale.

This area of the Yorkshire Dales covers the whole of the Craven district and the northern and western parts of the Borough of Harrogate district.

History
The constituency was created in 1983 from the parts of the former seats of Skipton and Ripon within the county of North Yorkshire.

Members of Parliament

Elections

Elections in the 2010s

 

In 2017, the Liberal Democrats stood aside and endorsed the Green Party.

Elections in the 2000s

Elections in the 1990s

Elections in the 1980s

See also
List of parliamentary constituencies in North Yorkshire

Notes

References

Parliamentary constituencies in Yorkshire and the Humber
Politics of the Borough of Harrogate
Politics of Ripon
Constituencies of the Parliament of the United Kingdom established in 1983
Politics of Craven District